Al-Sareeh SC is a Jordanian professional football club which is based in the district of Al-Sareeh in Irbid. Club currently competes in the Jordanian Pro League.

Stadium
Al-Sareeh plays their home games at Al-Hassan Stadium in Irbid. The stadium was built on 1971 and opened on 1976. It is also the home stadium of Al-Arabi and Al-Hussein. It has a current capacity of 12,000 spectators.

Kits
Al-Sareeh's home kit is all red shirts and shorts, while their away kit is all white shirts and shorts.

Kit suppliers and shirt sponsors

Current squad

Managerial History
 Ekrami Matbouli
 Nathem Shaker
 Malek Al-Shatnawi
 Osama Qasem
 Ahmed Al-Darzi
 Abdullah Al-Amareen

External links
Soccerway profile
فريق: الصريح

Sareeh
1973 establishments in Jordan